Second Lieutenant Edward Arthur Simpson (born 24 May 1892, date of death unknown) was a World War I flying ace credited with six aerial victories.

References

1892 births
Year of death missing
Royal Air Force personnel of World War I
Recipients of the Distinguished Flying Cross (United Kingdom)